A crayon is a stick of colored wax, charcoal, chalk or other material used for writing and drawing.

Crayon may also refer to:

 Crayon (band), American indiepop band
 "Crayon" (song)", a 2012 song by G-Dragon
 "Crayon", a song by Manitoba from his 2003 album Up in Flames
 Crayons (album), a 2008 album by Donna Summer, or the title track
 "Crayons" (song), a 2018 song by Cupcakke
 Le crayon, a nickname for the Tour du Crédit Lyonnais
 Crayon (film), 2010 Malaysian family drama film directed by Dean A. Burhanuddin
 Crayon, Ohio, a community in the United States
 Crayon Shin-chan, comedic comic and TV series by Yoshito Usui
 Crayons (film), a 2016 Indian film

See also
 Craiyon